Bykasovo is a rural locality (a village) in Fominskoye Rural Settlement, Gorokhovetsky District, Vladimir Oblast, Russia. The population was 215 as of 2010. There are 6 streets.

Geography 
Bykasovo is located on the Chucha River, 57 km southwest of Gorokhovets (the district's administrative centre) by road. Chernenkovo is the nearest rural locality.

References 

Rural localities in Gorokhovetsky District